Emmanuel Christian School is a coeducational, private Kindergarten to Year 10 Christian school in Rokeby, on Hobart's Eastern Shore. It is part of Christian Schools of Tasmania, a network of four schools around Hobart. It is owned and managed by an association, whose members are parents and past parents of students.

References

External links
Official website

Private secondary schools in Hobart
Private primary schools in Hobart
Nondenominational Christian schools in Tasmania
Educational institutions established in 1979
1979 establishments in Australia